Eyes of Eden is a German symphonic metal band founded in 2005 by multi-instrumentalist and record producer Waldemar Sorychta.

History 
Waldemar Sorychta started Eyes of Eden by writing songs and assembling the band. They recorded the material with Gas Lipstick (HIM) on drums. Singer Sandra Schleret recorded most of the vocals of the album, but then had some serious health issues to take care of, so she left the band before the album was finished. Eyes of Eden then appointed 20-year-old Franziska Huth to re-record the vocals on the album. Faith was released in 2007. The drum parts on the album were initially recorded by Gas Lipstick, but he was later replaced by Tom Diener. Alla Fedynitch was chosen as the bassist. Faith was released on 20 August 2007 in Europe and 6 November 2007 in North America.

Discography 
Studio albums
Faith (2007)

Band members 
Current members
Franziska Huth – vocals
Waldemar Sorychta – guitar
Alla Fedynitch – bass
Tom Diener – drums

Former members
Sandra Schleret – vocals
Gas Lipstick – drums

References

External links 
Official website
Eyes of Eden at MySpace
Eyes of Eden at Century Media Records

 
Musical groups established in 2005
German heavy metal musical groups
Century Media Records artists
Musical quartets
2005 establishments in Germany